Quincy is an unincorporated community in Adams County, Iowa, United States.

History
A post office was opened in Quincy in 1855, and remained in operation until it was discontinued in 1900. Quincy's population was 108 in 1902, and 50 in 1925.

Quincy once served as the county seat.

References

Unincorporated communities in Adams County, Iowa
1855 establishments in Iowa
Populated places established in 1855
Unincorporated communities in Iowa